The canton of Eurville-Bienville is an administrative division of the Haute-Marne department, northeastern France. It was created at the French canton reorganisation which came into effect in March 2015. Its seat is in Eurville-Bienville.

It consists of the following communes:
 
Bayard-sur-Marne
Chamouilley
Chevillon
Curel
Domblain
Eurville-Bienville
Fays
Fontaines-sur-Marne
Magneux
Maizières
Narcy
Osne-le-Val
Rachecourt-sur-Marne
Roches-sur-Marne
Sommancourt
Troisfontaines-la-Ville
Valleret

References

Cantons of Haute-Marne